Abd al-Aziz ibn al-Walid (died 728/729) was an Umayyad prince, commander in the wars against the Byzantine Empire, and governor of Damascus during the reign of his father, Caliph al-Walid I. The most prominent of al-Walid's sons, his father attempted to install him as his successor, but was unsuccessful. After the death of al-Walid's brother, Caliph Sulayman, Abd al-Aziz made a failed bid for the caliphate, his maternal uncle, Umar II, having succeeded to the office beforehand.

Background
Abd al-Aziz's mother was Umm al-Banin, a daughter of al-Walid's paternal uncle, Abd al-Aziz ibn Marwan. Al-Walid appointed Abd al-Aziz governor of Jund Dimashq (military district of Damascus).

Commander in the Arab–Byzantine wars
Abd al-Aziz led his first campaign against the Byzantines in Asia Minor in 709, when he captured a fortress, although his uncle Maslama ibn Abd al-Malik led the main raid of the year afterwards. In 710 he led the main Umayyad attack, although under the auspices of Maslama as commander-in-chief for the Byzantine front, and in 713 he led an attack against the frontier fortress of Gazelon.

Attempts at caliphal succession
In 714/715, Abd al-Aziz's father attempted to reverse the succession arrangement, by which the throne would pass to his brother Sulayman, in favour of Abd al-Aziz. In addition to various officials and poets in al-Walid's court, Abd al-Aziz gained the support of the powerful viceroy of the eastern half of the Caliphate, al-Hajjaj ibn Yusuf, who died in 714, the governor of Khurasan, Qutayba ibn Muslim, and a prominent Alid of Medina, Zayd, the son of Hasan ibn Ali.  The prominent Arabic poet Jarir promoted his succession in verse:

To ʿAbd al-ʿAzīz are raised the eyes of the flock, when the shepherds made their choice 
His merits call attention to him, when the state's tent pole and 
the heavens fall. 
The possessors of authority from Quraysh said, 'The pledge is 
incumbent upon us when the race is run,'
And they considered ʿAbd al-ʿAzīz to be the successor to (the) covenant; they have not acted wrongfully in that, nor done evil. 
Let it slide in its entirety to him, Commander of the Faithful, if you so wish. 
For the people have already stretched out their hands and the veil has gone. 
And if they were to make the pledge of allegiance to you as successor to (the) 
covenant, then justice would be established and the building would be in balance. 

Despite significant support for Abd al-Aziz, al-Walid was unable to impose his will and Sulayman succeeded him. When Sulayman died in northern Syria in 717, Abd al-Aziz intended to claim the throne in Damascus, but upon learning that his maternal uncle, Umar II had been chosen as caliph, he presented himself before him and acknowledged his rule. According to the account of the historian al-Waqidi (d. 823), during their encounter Umar informed Abd al-Aziz that he would not have disputed his accession, to which Abd al-Aziz replied: "I would not like anyone else but you to have taken over the office". 

Abd al-Aziz died in AH 110 (728/729 CE). During the reign of Abd al-Aziz's cousin, Caliph al-Walid II, there were proposals to nominate Abd al-Aziz's son, Atiq, as the caliph's successor. Al-Walid II nominated his own sons, al-Hakam and Uthman, instead, which led to the intra-Umayyad Third Muslim Civil War.

References

Sources 
 
 
 
 
 
 

7th-century births
720s deaths
Umayyad people of the Arab–Byzantine wars
Sons of Umayyad caliphs
Generals of the Umayyad Caliphate
Umayyad governors of Damascus
Arab generals
8th-century Arabs